Anatoliy Sergeevich Malykhin (born January 11, 1988), is a Russian mixed martial artist, who currently competes in the Light Heavyweight and Heavyweight divisions of ONE Championship, where he is a double champion, being the current ONE Light Heavyweight Champion and interim ONE Heavyweight World Champion, he also competed for Fight Nights Global (now AMC Fights Night).

Biography 
Anatoly Malykhin was born on January 11, 1988, in the city of Kemerovo, Kemerovo Oblast, Soviet Union (now Russia). The athlete's sports career began with freestyle wrestling. He was able to achieve significant success in this martial art. Malykhin repeatedly became the winner of Russia, in 2013, Malykhin received a bronze medal at the Russian Championship among heavyweight wrestlers. However, soon there was a break in the wrestler's sports career: Anatoly was disqualified for 2 years due to the fact that he did not appear for doping tests. In 2016, Malykhin won the title of European champion in grappling, a European modification of jiu-jitsu wrestling.

Mixed martial arts career

Early career 
According to Anatoly, there are no prospects for wrestlers in his native Kemerovo. Despite the fact that the city has a large number of good coaches and athletes, Kemerovo remains a province. Anatoly Malykhin was repeatedly invited to Moscow. In the capital, he met MMA coach Vladimir Osiy, who became the athlete's mentor.

In professional mixed martial arts, Malykhin made his debut in September 2016, defeating compatriot Ilya Gunenko in the first round of the first fight. He would return 3 months later against Murad Kalimetov at Battle on the Volga Border 2016, winning the bout. 

2017 was a successful year for Anatoly. In May, a native of Kemerovo won the title of Russian champion in MMA, defeating Dagestani Salimgerey Rasulov. In October 2017, the Russian by technical knockout defeated the Uzbek athlete Azamat Bahodurzoda in the final of the amateur world championship in MMA, held in Astana.

He would return to professional MMA on November 3, 2017, where he meet in the ring with the representative of Iran – Reza Torabi. As a result of work on the ground, Anatoly delivered a series of powerful blows to the opponent in the back of the head, after which the referee stops the fight. 

After winning his next three bouts against Michał Wlazło at Golden Team Championship 3, Magomedbag Agaev at Fight Nights Global 91, and finally Jake Heun at Absolute Siberian Championship 1, all by first round submissions, Malykin had one of the most striking fights on April 25, 2019, as part of Fight Nights Global 93. In the cage, Anatoly was opposed by Alexei Kudin (25–12–1). Despite his extensive experience in MMA fights, Kudin failed to oppose Anatoly Malykhin. Anatoly constantly imposed his fighting style on his opponent. In the second round, Malykhin took the bout to the ground, after which he inflicted a series of punches on the opponent, leading the referee to stop the bout.

Malykhin's last bout on the Russian scene took place on October 30, 2019. As part of the GTC 07 tournament, Anatoly was opposed by the Argentinean Lucas Elsina. Anatoly Malykhin worked in a classic style for himself, trying to take his opponent down. Malykhin's strategy did not fail him this time either. In the first round, Anatoly took Elsina down and finished him with blows from his left hand to the head, leading to a TKO stoppage.

After his undefeated run on the Russian regional scene, Malykin signed with ONE Championship.

ONE Championship 
Malykhin made his promotional debut against Alexandre Machado on February 26, 2021, and aired on March 5, 2021, at ONE: First of Fury 2. He won the fight via technical knockout (submission to punches) in the first round, having managed to pin Machado in a crucifix and proceed to connect elbows, against which Machado proceeded to surrender.

Malykhin faced Amir Aliakbari on September 24, 2021, at ONE: Revolution. He won the fight via knockout in the first round.

Interim ONE Heavyweight World Champion
Malykhin was scheduled to face Kirill Grishenko for the interim ONE Heavyweight World Championship on January 28, 2022, at ONE: Only the Brave. However, Malykhin forced to withdraw withdrew due to tested positive for COVID-19 days before the event and the bout was moved to ONE: Bad Blood on February 11, 2022. He won the fight via knockout in the second round. This win earned him the $100,000 Performance of the Night award.

Malykhin was scheduled to Arjan Bhullar for the ONE Heavyweight World Championship unification bout on September 29, 2022, at ONE 161. However, Bhullar withdraw due to suffering an injury in training and it was announced that Bhullar had surgery on the arm two weeks ago and the bout was cancelled.

Earned the double champion
Malykhin faced Reinier de Ridder for the ONE Light Heavyweight World Championship on December 3, 2022, at ONE on Prime Video 5. He won the fight via knockout in the first round and earned the title. This win earned him his second prize of $100,000 Performance of the Night award.

The match between Malykhin and Arjan Bhullar for the ONE Heavyweight World Championship unification bout was rescheduled for March 25, 2023, at ONE Fight Night 8. However, the bout was removed from the event due to a shift in broadcaster commitments.

Personal life 
Anatoly and his wife Anita Malykhin have a son named Lev, born in 2020.

Championships and accomplishments 
ONE Championship
Interim ONE Heavyweight World Championship (One time; current)
ONE Light Heavyweight World Championship (One time; current)
Performance of the Night (Two times; bonus $100,000) 
2022 MMA Athlete of the Year

Mixed martial arts record 

|-
|Win
|align=center| 12–0
|Reinier de Ridder
|KO (punches)
|ONE on Prime Video 5
|
|align=center| 1
|align=center| 4:35
|Pasay, Philippines 
|
|-
|Win
|align=center| 11–0
|Kirill Grishenko 
|KO (punch)
|ONE: Bad Blood
|
|align=center| 2
|align=center| 3:42
|Kallang, Singapore 
|
|-
|Win
|align=center| 10–0
|Amir Aliakbari
|KO (punches)
|ONE: Revolution
|
|align=center| 1
|align=center| 2:57
|Kallang, Singapore 
|
|-
|Win
|align=center| 9–0
|Alexandre Machado
|TKO (submission to punches)
|ONE: Fists of Fury 2
|
|align=center| 1
|align=center| 3:28
|Kallang, Singapore 
|
|-
|Win
|align=center| 8–0
|Lucas Alsina
|TKO (punches)
|Golden Team Championship 7
|
|align=center| 1
|align=center| 3:34
|Moscow, Russia
|
|-
|Win
|align=center| 7–0
|Alexei Kudin
|TKO (punches)
|Fight Nights Global 93
|
|align=center| 2
|align=center| 3:32
|Mytishchi, Russia
|
|-
|Win
|align=center| 6–0
|Jake Heun
|Submission (keylock)
|Absolute Siberian Championship 1
|
|align=center| 1
|align=center| 1:45
|Kemerovo, Russia
|
|-
|Win
|align=center| 5–0
|Magomedbag Agaev
|Submission (keylock)
|Fight Nights Global 91
|
|align=center| 1
|align=center| 1:22
|Moscow, Russia
|
|-
|Win
|align=center| 4–0
|Michał Wlazło
|Submission (rear-naked choke)
|Golden Team Championship 3
|
|align=center|1
|align=center|3:35
|Lyubertsy, Russia
|
|-
|Win
|align=center| 3–0
|Reza Torabi
|TKO (punches)
|Golden Team Championship 1
|
|align=center| 1
|align=center| 2:26
|Moscow, Russia
|
|-
|Win
|align=center| 2–0
|Murad Kalimetov
|Submission (arm-triangle choke)
|Battle on the Volga Border 2016
|
|align=center| 1
|align=center| 3:10
|Balakovo, Russia
|
|-
|Win
|align=center| 1–0
|Ilya Gunenko
|TKO (punches)
|SK Pro: Grandprix MMA Quarterfinals 
|
|align=center| 1
|align=center| 2:21
|Tomsk, Russia
|

See also 
 List of current ONE fighters
 List of undefeated mixed martial artists

References

External links
 Anatoly Malykhin at ONE Championship

1988 births
Russian male mixed martial artists
Living people
People from Kemerovo
Sportspeople from Kemerovo
Heavyweight mixed martial artists
Light heavyweight mixed martial artists
Mixed martial artists utilizing freestyle wrestling
Mixed martial artists utilizing boxing
Russian male sport wrestlers
ONE Championship champions